Brian McGrattan (born 31 December 1959) is a former New Zealand rugby union player. A prop, McGrattan represented Wellington and, briefly, Waikato at a provincial level, and was a member of the New Zealand national side, the All Blacks, from 1983 to 1986. He played 23 matches for the All Blacks including six internationals.

References

1959 births
Living people
Rugby union players from Wellington City
People educated at Rongotai College
New Zealand rugby union players
New Zealand international rugby union players
Wellington rugby union players
Waikato rugby union players
Rugby union props